Tauseef, Tausif or Tawsif (Arabic, Persian and ;) is a name of Arabic origin and may refer to:

As a male given name
 Tauseef Ahmed (born 1958), Pakistani cricketer
 Tausif Ahmed, Bangladeshi musician known mononymously as Tausif

 Md. Tauseef Alam (born 1980), Indian politician
 Tauseef Bukhari (born 1964), Pakistani cricketer
 Tawsif Mahbub (born 1988), Bangladeshi actor
 Tauseef Satti (born 1980), Pakistani cricketer

As a surname
 Afzal Tauseef (1936–2014), Pakistani writer and journalist
 Rana Asif Tauseef (born 1967), Pakistani politician
 Rana Zahid Tauseef, Pakistani politician